Syria I or Syria Prima ("First Syria", in , Prṓtē Suríā) was a Byzantine province, formed c. 415 out of Syria Coele. The province survived until the Muslim conquest of Syria in the 630s.

History
Syria I emerged out of Syria Coele, which during the reign of Antiochus III was one of the four satrapies in its region that included Phoenicia, Idumea, and an unknown territory that included Palestine.  The Syria Coele region along the Euphrates was separated to form the province of Euphratensis. After c. 415 Syria Coele was further subdivided into Syria I (or Syria Prima), with the capital remaining at Antioch, and Syria II (Syria Secunda) or Syria Salutaris, with capital at Apamea on the Orontes. In 528, Justinian I carved out the small coastal province Theodorias out of territory from both provinces.

The region remained one of the most important provinces of the Byzantine Empire. It was governed by a Consularis based in Antioch. Syria Prima was occupied by the Sasanians between 609 and 628, then recovered by the emperor Heraclius, but  lost again to the advancing Muslims after the Battle of Yarmouk and the fall of Antioch.

References 

Late Roman provinces
Provinces of the Byzantine Empire
Justinian I
410s establishments
5th-century establishments in the Byzantine Empire
States and territories disestablished in the 7th century
7th-century disestablishments in the Byzantine Empire
Byzantine Syria